Homestead is an unincorporated community in Sheridan County, Montana, United States. The community had a post office until November 19, 1994; it still has its own ZIP code, 59242.

Originally named Barford, the town name was changed to Pederson in 1908 after the postmaster. After confusion with the mail, the citizens chose the name Fort Peck for the new community. The town of Poplar objected to this name, since it was the headquarters of the Fort Peck Indian Agency. The residents then chose the name Homestead.

Demographics

References

Unincorporated communities in Sheridan County, Montana
Unincorporated communities in Montana